Sciopithes is a genus of broad-nosed weevils in the beetle family Curculionidae. There are about six described species in Sciopithes.

Species
These six species belong to the genus Sciopithes:
 Sciopithes arcuatus Casey, 1888 i c g
 Sciopithes insularis Van Dyke, 1935 i c g
 Sciopithes intermedius Van Dyke, 1935 i c g
 Sciopithes obscurus Horn, 1876 i c g b (obscure root weevil)
 Sciopithes setosus Casey, 1888 i c g
 Sciopithes sordidus Van Dyke, 1935 i c g
Data sources: i = ITIS, c = Catalogue of Life, g = GBIF, b = Bugguide.net

References

Further reading

 
 
 
 

Entiminae
Articles created by Qbugbot